Steinberger is a series of distinctive electric guitars and bass guitars, designed and originally manufactured by Ned Steinberger. The name "Steinberger" can be used to refer to either the instruments themselves or the company that originally produced them. Although the name has been applied to a variety of instruments, it is primarily associated with a minimalist "headless" design of electric basses and guitars.

History
The first Steinberger basses were produced in 1979 in Brooklyn, New York by Ned Steinberger, essentially alone. While attempting to source materials in an industrial area of New York City, he visited Lane Marine, a lifeboat builder, where he met with Bob Young, an engineer with deep knowledge of carbon fiber. Though Young was more than twice Steinberger’s age and had no experience with musical instruments, he joined forces with Steinberger after getting great feedback from his son,  Gary Young, a recording engineer and the original drummer for Pavement, who took to the instrument and understood the appeal of its construction. A company, Steinberger Sound, was duly set up to manufacture the basses and later the guitars on a larger scale at Newburgh, New York. The company was eventually sold to Gibson in 1987, although Steinberger remained part of the company for some time. Gibson still retains rights over the "Steinberger" name, precluding Ned Steinberger from calling his new instruments "Steinbergers". Ned Steinberger has operated a company called "NS Design" since 1990 and produces electric violin family instruments: double basses, cellos, viola, violin. All of these instruments have a number of interesting innovations in materials and design. An NS Bass Guitar (headless) was added later to the production line.

With changing musical fashions and the complex manufacturing and inordinately high prices putting off buyers and producer alike, Gibson stopped selling Steinberger guitars in the mid-1990s.  Enthusiasm for the instruments has now revived to a sufficient extent that they are again being produced and sold, although the newer versions share few commonalities with the original "Newburgh" designs. The latest Gibson/Steinberger line, known collectively as the Synapse line, are produced in South Korea. This comprises two guitar models and one bass guitar model. The new instruments are part wood and part graphite composite, and are not interchangeable with the original Steinberger guitars.  The two guitar models most resemble the original Steinbergers with rectangular bodies only slightly larger than the originals. One of the guitar models, the Trans Scale model, features a longer than average scale length and a built-in adjustable capo. By moving the capo closer to the end of the neck, one can play notes lower than standard guitar tuning without having to detune. By not forcing guitarists to detune to play lower notes, the Trans Scale allows guitarists to maintain consistent tone while playing in a lower-than-standard range.

Instrument design

The best-known Steinberger design is the L-series instrument, sometimes described as shaped like a broom, boat oar, or cricket bat. Initially produced as an electric bass and later as a guitar, the instrument was made entirely of "Steinberger Blend", a "proprietary" graphite and carbon-fiber mix in two pieces: the main body and a faceplate (the "blend" being an off-the-shelf carbon fiber "system" from the DuPont product line). The headstock was eliminated, the tuning hardware instead installed on a tailpiece mounted to the face of the guitar body. The tuners utilized a finer than normal 18:1 gear ratio, with 40 threads per inch, which gave slower but more precise adjustment and helped reduce string slippage. Depending on the tailpiece, calibrated or uncalibrated double-ball end strings were used, with the former required in order to use the transposing feature of the TransTrem vibrato unit. The rationale for the overall design was the elimination of unnecessary weight, especially the unbalanced headstock, and the use of modern materials, such as graphite, for their advantages over wood. L-series basses came with one or two pick-ups; a high-impedance DiMarzio or two low-impedance EMGs, with the L2 having two EMGs. In 1990, the design would win Ned Steinberger a "Design of the Decade" award from the Industrial Designers Society of America.

The all-synthetic construction gave a very smooth sound and feel, immediate note attack, and very even tonal response. Depending upon the preferences of the listener, this was either a good thing, as it made the instrument sonically clean, or a bad thing, as it made the instrument sound synthetic and unnatural. Steinberger was and still is proud of this dichotomy and one of their slogans was "We don't make 'em like they used to."

Another innovation created by Ned Steinberger for some of these instruments was the TransTrem, a patented (now long lapsed) transposing vibrato assembly that proportionally adjusted the string tensions to enable immediate accurate retuning of the instrument with the transposing vibrato lever. The TransTrem provided the functionality of a capo in addition to vibrato effects. Bass and guitar versions were available.

Later designs included:

 P-series guitars and basses featured a smaller wooden body with bolt-on composite neck. The body was shaped more like an arrow or mini-A than the rectangular L series body.
 S-series which featured the only Steinberger with a headstock. Very rare with about 300-350 built.  The guitar featured Ned Steinberger's 40:1 gearless tuners.
 M-series guitars and basses, designed by English luthier Roger Giffin. These had a twin-cutaway wooden body and a bolt-on graphite neck, resulting in a more traditional look, yet still with the headless tuning system and optional TransTrem.
 K-series guitars designed by American luthier Steve Klein. These featured an ergonomically designed body of non-standard shape again married to a headless graphite neck. A similar version is still made by luthier Lorenzo German, an employee of Klein who currently owns and runs Klein Electric Guitars.
 Q-series basses featured twin cutaway bodies and a bolt-on graphite neck. The body style was more modern than the M series. Introduced in 1990 the body underwent a significant revision in the mid '90s but kept the same moniker.
 Synapse guitars and basses are instruments manufactured by Gibson under the Steinberger name, with Ned Steinberger contributing to the design.  The bodies are through neck maple construction with maple wings.  The truss rod is in a graphite channel with a phenolic resin fretboard. They have a non tremolo fixed bridge. These guitars can use double ball or standard guitar strings without an adapter. Fitted with two active EMG pickups the on board pre-amp is  able to boost and cut  treble and bass frequencies. Additionally there is a mix pot for the built in piezo under bridge pickups. As well as a regular guitar model, the Synapse line also includes baritone guitars with a built-in Transcale capo that can be rolled up the frets. The Transcale guitar can be strung with standard guitar strings or a set of baritone strings.

Several companies licensed the headless technology from Steinberger and produced numerous all-wood clones or similar instruments.  Hohner, for example, produced licensed all-wood L-series copies and Cort produced headless guitars with different body designs. Current official all-wood instruments are sold under the Spirit by Steinberger brand.  The Spirit comes in two versions, the Deluxe and Standard.  The Deluxe features bridge and neck humbucker pickups with a single coil in the middle position and the Standard features a bridge humbucker and two single coils at the middle and neck position.  This is the only difference between the two models.

Notable players

Guitars

 Jerry Garcia of Grateful Dead/Jerry Garcia Band
 Warren Cuccurullo of Duran Duran
 Mark Knopfler of Dire Straits
 Maurice Gibb of Bee Gees
 Eddie Van Halen of Van Halen
 David Bowie (with Tin Machine in 1991–1992 and the "Valentine's Day" music video in 2013)
 Reeves Gabrels (also with Tin Machine)
 Lou Reed of the Velvet Underground
 David Gilmour of Pink Floyd
 Greg Lake
 Don Felder of the Eagles
Augusto Licks of Engenheiros do Hawaii (Brazil)
 Vito Bratta of White Lion
 Allan Holdsworth
 Luis Alberto Spinetta
 Steve Hillage
 Mike Rutherford of Genesis
 Rhoma Irama of Soneta
 Buck Dharma of Blue Öyster Cult
 Johnny Winter
 Martin Tielli of Rheostatics
 Paul Masvidal of Cynic
 David Rhodes with Peter Gabriel
 Paul Stanley of Kiss
 Leslie West of Mountain
 David Torn
 David Sylvian
 Roga-Roga of Extra Musica
 Alain Makaba of Wenge Musica

Bass

 Maurice Gibb of Bee Gees
 George "Chocolate" Perry of Joe Walsh, Joe Vitale, and Bee Gees
 Geddy Lee of Rush
 Sting of the Police
 Bill Wyman of the Rolling Stones
 Roger Glover of Deep Purple
 John Illsley of Dire Straits (during the Live Aid concert)
 Phil Soussan of Ozzy Osbourne
 Greg Lake
 Danny Klein of the J. Geils Band
 Dougie Thomson of Supertramp (in the video for "Free As A Bird")
 Jean Jacques Burnel of The Stranglers
 Peter Cetera of Chicago
 Cliff Williams of AC/DC
 Humberto Gessinger of Engenheiros do Hawaii
 Earl Falconer of UB40
John Taylor of Duran Duran
 Jamaaladeen Tacuma
 Robbie Shakespeare of Sly & Robbie
 Gerald Casale of DEVO
 Ross Valory of Journey
 Patrick Stump (during Soul Punk in 2011, using the 5 strings bass)
 Curt Smith of Tears for Fears
Arif Mirabdolbaghi of Protest the Hero
 Fat Mike of NOFX
 Eddie Van Halen of Van Halen
 Tina Weymouth of Talking Heads
 Leo "E-Zee Kill" Williams of Big Audio Dynamite
Andrew Wood of Malfunkshun and Mother Love Bone
Jozef Ráž of Elán
 John Entwistle of The Who (in the video for “Don’t Let Go The Coat”)
 Tony Lewis of The Outfield
 Zeta Bosio of Soda Stereo 
 Nick Feldman of Wang Chung

Imitations and licensed copies
The Washburn Bantam was an unlicensed 1980s imitation of the Steinberger headless style. The Bantam did not require the double-ball end strings of the Steinberger.

The Hohner B2 and Jack Basses were licensed imitations, the Jack with a full wooden body, and using the same patented locking and tuning system as the L series, although without the graphite neck. As such, it required double-ball end strings in the same way as the Steinberger originals. Hohner continues to offer the G3T Steinberger licensed guitars, which have been available since "the late 1980s". The G3T is a wooden rendering of the Steinberger composite guitar in appearance, with maple neck and rosewood fingerboard, and licensed tremolo bridge.

A wooden licensed solid bass was produced by Cort Guitars in the mid 1980s. This instrument is more than a copy and is now sought after again.

In the early 1980s, Kramer Guitars also manufactured a headless bass called the Duke series.  Although the overall form was similar to Steinberger's, the Duke series had an aluminum/wood neck and wood body. Standard geared tuning pegs were located at the bridge-end of the instrument.

References

External links

 
 Very informative Steinberger fan site
 Ned Steinberger's current company NS Design
 Vintage Kramer guitars, Scroll about half-way down the page.
 A great source for the vintage original "Newburgh" Steinbergers, Luthier was head of production at the factory.

Guitar manufacturing companies of the United States
Musical instrument manufacturing companies based in New York City
Companies based in Brooklyn
Electric guitars
Bass guitar manufacturing companies
Companies that filed for Chapter 11 bankruptcy in 2018